The Niokolo Koba is a river in Senegal. The river is a tributary to the Gambia River, and runs mainly through the Niokolo-Koba National Park.

References

Rivers of Senegal